The 2020 Vankor 350 was the 8th stock car race of the 2020 NASCAR Gander RV & Outdoors Truck Series season, and the 22nd iteration of the event. The race was held on Saturday, July 18, 2020 in Fort Worth, Texas at Texas Motor Speedway, a  permanent tri-oval shaped racetrack. The race took the scheduled 167 laps to complete. At race's end, Kyle Busch, driving for his own team, Kyle Busch Motorsports would win the race, the 59th NASCAR Gander RV & Outdoors Truck Series of his career and the 3rd of the season. To fill the podium, Christian Eckes of Kyle Busch Motorsports and Matt Crafton of ThorSport Racing finished 2nd and 3rd, respectively.

Background 

Texas Motor Speedway is a speedway located in the northernmost portion of the U.S. city of Fort Worth, Texas – the portion located in Denton County, Texas. The track measures 1.5 miles (2.4 km) around and is banked 24 degrees in the turns, and is of the oval design, where the front straightaway juts outward slightly. The track layout is similar to Atlanta Motor Speedway and Charlotte Motor Speedway (formerly Lowe's Motor Speedway). The track is owned by Speedway Motorsports, Inc., the same company that owns Atlanta and Charlotte Motor Speedway, as well as the short-track Bristol Motor Speedway.

Entry list

Starting lineup 
A random draw was made to determine the pole for the race. Sheldon Creed of GMS Racing would draw the pole for the race.

Race results 
Stage 1 Laps: 40

Stage 2 Laps: 40

Stage 3 Laps: 87

References 

2020 NASCAR Gander RV & Outdoors Truck Series
NASCAR races at Texas Motor Speedway
July 2020 sports events in the United States
2020 in sports in Texas